Sherif El-Khashab (born September 25, 1961) is an Egyptian football manager, He is a served as a head coach of Chad national football team from 2009 to 2011.

References

1961 births
Living people
Egyptian football managers
Expatriate football managers in Chad
Chad national football team managers
Egyptian expatriate football managers
Egyptian expatriate sportspeople in Chad